, also referred to as Hakone Lake or Ashinoko Lake, is a scenic lake in the Hakone area of Kanagawa Prefecture in Honshū, Japan. It is a crater lake that lies along the southwest wall of the caldera of Mount Hakone, a complex volcano that last erupted in 1170 CE at Ōwakudani.  The lake is known for its views of Mount Fuji, its numerous hot springs, historical sites, and ryokan. The lake is located on the Tōkaidō road, the main link between Kyoto and Tokyo. A number of pleasure boats and ferries traverse the lake, providing scenic views for tourists and passengers. Several of the boats are inspired by the design of sailing warships.

Most visitors to Lake Ashi stay in one of the hotels or ryokan located in the area to visit some of the local attractions. There is also a campsite at the north end of the lake. Hakone Shrine is a shrine that has been visited by shōgun, samurai, and many travelers over the centuries. Large sections of the Old Tōkaidō road are preserved here. Onshi Park was the summer retreat for the imperial family that is now a public park. Taking the aerial tram Hakone Ropeway to The Great Boiling Valley.  From Togendai on Lake Ashi, the Hakone Ropeway aerial tram connects to Sounzan, the upper terminus of the Hakone Tozan Cable Car funicular railway. This in turn connects to the Hakone Tozan Line mountain railway for the descent to Odawara and a connection to Tokyo by the Tōkaidō Shinkansen.

Visitors can also take the Hakone Sightseeing Cruise with its pirate ships from Togendai to Moto-Hakone Port and Hakone-Machi Port on opposite ends of the lake. The cruise line began in 1950.

The name means "lake of reeds" in Japanese: 芦 (ashi) is "reed", and 湖 (ko) is "lake". The abundance of nature makes it popular with hikers. There are many trails with different levels of challenge.

Lake Ashi is emptied by the Fukara Aqueduct toward Susono, Shizuoka since its completion in 1670, not by the Haya River toward Odawara, Kanagawa.

Gallery

References

External links 

 Hakone Tourist Association
 Lake Ashinoko - Hakone Geopark
 

Volcanic crater lakes
Lakes of Japan
Fuji-Hakone-Izu National Park
Hakone, Kanagawa
Izu–Bonin–Mariana Arc
Landforms of Kanagawa Prefecture
Tourist attractions in Kanagawa Prefecture
Calderas of Honshū